Sweetwood is a common name for several plants and may refer to:

Laurus nobilis, native to the Mediterranean region
Myrospermum susanum
Nectandra
Ocotea
Oreodaphne leucoxylon